Steven Tom (born 5 February 1951) is an English retired professional footballer who played as a defender in the Football League for Brentford. He later made over 150 appearances for Southern League club Barnet.

Playing career

Brentford 
Tom began his career at Queens Park Rangers and joined Fourth Division club Brentford in 1971. He made 21 appearances and scored one goal, on his debut, during the 1971–72 season, in which the Bees won promotion to the Third Division with a third-place finish. Tom was released at the end of the season.

Non-league football 

After his release from Brentford, Tom dropped into non-League football and played for Barnet and Ilford in the Southern and Isthmian leagues respectively.

Personal life 
After his retirement from football, Tom worked as a black cab driver.

Honours 
Brentford
 Football League Fourth Division third-place promotion: 1971–72

Career statistics

References

1951 births
People from Ware, Hertfordshire
English footballers
Brentford F.C. players
English Football League players
Queens Park Rangers F.C. players
Barnet F.C. players
Association football defenders
Isthmian League players
Ilford F.C. players
Southern Football League players
Association football midfielders
Living people